Tasmarubrius is a genus of Australian tangled nest spiders first described by V. T. Davies in 1998.

Species
 it contains five species:
Tasmarubrius hickmani Davies, 1998 – Australia (Tasmania)
Tasmarubrius milvinus (Simon, 1903) – Australia (Tasmania)
Tasmarubrius pioneer Davies, 1998 – Australia (Tasmania)
Tasmarubrius tarraleah Davies, 1998 – Australia (Tasmania)
Tasmarubrius truncus Davies, 1998 – Australia (Tasmania)

References

Amaurobiidae
Araneomorphae genera
Spiders of Australia
Taxa named by Valerie Todd Davies